Eccopsis deprinsi is a species of moth of the family Tortricidae that is endemic to Kenya.

References

External links

Moths described in 2004
Endemic moths of Kenya
Olethreutini
Moths of Africa